Veeranna may refer to:

 Gubbi Veeranna  (1890–1974), Indian theatre director
 Veerannapalem,  a village and a panchayat located in the Parchur mandal of the Prakasam district
 Veerannapeta,  a village in Kondurg mandal of Mahbubnagar district
 Veeranna (film), a 2005 Tamil drama film